In shogi, the Pinwheel (風車 kazaguruma) is an uncommon opening with the rook on the bottom rank 9 enabling it to switch between a Ranging Rook and Static Rook attack.

The pinwheel name comes from the way the king is able to rotate around the gold positioned on the 58 square as if it were a wheel.

Against Static Rook Anaguma

Example of development from Habu (1992).

1. P-76 P-84

2. S-68 P-34

3. P-66 S-62

4. R-58 K-42

5. K-48 K-32

6. K-38 B-33

7. P-56 P-54

8. S-48 

8... K-22

9. S-66 S-53

10. P-46 L-12

11. P-36 K-11

12. S-47 S-32

13. G-48 P-85

14. B-77 G-52

15. N-37 P-44

16. P-55 

16... Px55

17. Rx55 P*54

18. R-59 G-43

19. P-16 P-14

20. P-26 G-31

21. G-78 P-74

22. B-68 P-94

23. P-96 R-72

24. G-77 P-75

25. Px75 Rx75

26. P*76 R-72

Game example

A similar position occurs in a 1991 game between Yasuharu Ōyama (Black) and Michio Ariyoshi (White).

Itō's Pinwheel variations

Bibliography

 羽生 [Habu], 善治 [Yoshiharu]. 1992 [2010]. 居飛車穴熊vs中飛車. 羽生の頭脳: 居飛車穴熊と左美濃 (Vol. 4, Chap. 3). 日本将棋連盟.
 伊藤 [Itou], 果 [Hatasu]. 1994. 風車の美学: 伊藤果直伝! 毎日コミュニケーションズ.

External links
 将棋DB2: 大山康晴 (Ōyama) vs 有吉道夫 (Ariyoshi) November 1991 · Oyama plays a Pinwheel position

Shogi openings
Central Rook openings
Static Rook openings